"Blood of Eden" is the third single from English rock musician Peter Gabriel's 1992 album Us, featuring backing vocals by Sinéad O'Connor. It narrowly failed to enter the UK top 40, peaking at number 43.

The single has two B-side tracks: A remix of "Mercy Street" (originally from Gabriel's previous studio album So, released in 1986) by William Orbit and an earlier version of the a-side. This version had originally appeared in the Wim Wenders film Until the End of the World (1991) but was not included on the official soundtrack.

The female vocal part of the song was performed on the 1993–1994 Secret World Tour first by British musician Joy Askew, then by Sinéad O'Connor for a few months, and finally by American singer-songwriter Paula Cole. Cole's duet with Gabriel was released on both the Secret World Live album, as well as on the Secret World Live concert film.

In 2011, Gabriel re-released the song with orchestral background on the album New Blood.

Track listing
All songs were written by Peter Gabriel.

CD single
 "Blood of Eden" (album version) – 6:33
 "Mercy Street" (William Orbit mix) – 8:00
 "Blood of Eden" (Special mix for Wim Wenders' Until the End of the World) – 6:15

Personnel
 Peter Gabriel – lead vocals, keyboards, keyboard bass
 Tony Levin – bass guitars
 David Rhodes – 12-string guitars
 David Bottrill – programming

Additional musicians
 Daniel Lanois – hi-hat, backing vocals
 Richard Blair – additional programming
 Levon Minassian – duoduok
 Sinéad O'Connor – backing vocals
 Shankar – violin
 Gus Isidore – bridge guitars
 Richard Chappell – bridge section mix

References

External links
List of various formats with detailed track lists at Discogs.com.

1993 singles
Peter Gabriel songs
Songs written by Peter Gabriel
Song recordings produced by Daniel Lanois
1992 songs
Geffen Records singles
Virgin Records singles